Alaska wine refers to wine made in the state of Alaska.  Alaskan wineries import juice from out of state to make Merlot, Chardonnay, Cabernet Sauvignon, Pinot Noir and Riesling. Some wineries produce wine made with fruits other than grapes. Alaska's signature wines are made from honey and native Alaskan fruit such as raspberry, blueberry, strawberry, salmonberry, gooseberry and rhubarb. Some wineries also produce ice wine. There are no designated American Viticultural Areas in the state.

See also
 Alaska Wine Exploring Worlds Old & New
 Alaska Wineries Go Taste Wine 2021

References

Wine
Alaskan cuisine
Tourism in Alaska
Wine regions of the United States by state
Food and drink in Alaska